The Stranraer and Wigtownshire Free Press is a local weekly newspaper based in Stranraer, Rhins, Wigtownshire, Scotland, which primarily serves Stranraer and the Rhins area but also Wigtownshire and parts of Dumfries and Galloway.

Known locally as the "Free Press", it is officially published every Thursday but is distributed on Wednesday afternoons. It is the most popular newspaper in Wigtownshire with 92% of adults living within a thirty-minute drive of Stranraer reading the paper. Over 7,500 copies are sold each week.

The current Editor is John Cooper. The paper also employs two journalists, Louise Kerr and Jennifer Jones.

Previous reporters include Cameron Ritchie, Euan Maxwell, Nick Dowson, Jen Stout and Dan Palmer.

References

External links
 Stranraer and Wigtownshire Free Press Website
Stair Estates Website

Wigtownshire
Dumfries and Galloway
Newspapers published in Scotland
Stranraer
1843 establishments in Scotland
Publications established in 1843